In music and other performing arts, the phrase  (from Latin for 'at one's pleasure' or 'as you desire'), often shortened to "ad lib" (as an adjective or adverb) or "ad-lib" (as a verb or noun), refers to various forms of improvisation.

The roughly synonymous phrase  ('in accordance with [one's] good pleasure') is less common but, in its Italian form , has entered the musical lingua franca (see below).

Libido is the etymologically closer cognate known in English.

Music
As a direction in sheet music,  indicates that the performer or conductor has one of a variety of types of discretion with respect to a given passage:
to play the passage in free time rather than in strict or "metronomic" tempo (a practice known as rubato when not expressly indicated by the composer);
to improvise a melodic line fitting the general structure prescribed by the passage's written notes or chords;
to omit an instrument part, such as a nonessential accompaniment, for the duration of the passage; or
in the phrase "repeat ," to play the passage an arbitrary number of times (cf. vamp).

Note that the direction  (see above) has a more restricted meaning, generally referring to only the first two types of discretion. Baroque music, especially, has a written or implied , with most composers intimating the freedom the performer and conductor have.

For post-Baroque classical music and jazz, see cadenza.

Other performing arts
"Ad-lib" is used to describe individual moments during live theatre when an actor speaks through their character using words not found in the play's text. When the entire performance is predicated on spontaneous creation, the process is called improvisational theatre.

In film, the term ad-lib usually refers to the interpolation of unscripted material in an otherwise scripted performance. For example, in interviews, Dustin Hoffman says he ad-libbed the now famous line, "I'm walking here! I'm walking here!" as "Ratso" Rizzo in Midnight Cowboy.

Live performers such as television talk-show hosts sometimes deliver material that sounds ad-libbed but is actually scripted. They may employ ad-lib writers to prepare such material. Some actors are also known for their ability or tendency to ad-lib, such as Peter Falk (of the series Columbo), who would ad-lib such mannerisms as absent-mindedness while in character.

The HBO sitcom Curb Your Enthusiasm by Seinfeld co-creator Larry David primarily uses retroscripting and ad lib instead of scripted dialogue.

See also

List of Latin phrases

Improvisation
Mad Libs

References

 

Latin words and phrases
Improvisation
Musical terminology